Tushar Yashvant Choudhary is Shiv Sena Politician from Thane district, Maharashtra. He is the current Mayor of Bhiwandi-Nizampur Municipal Corporation. He has been elected as concellor for one 
consecutive terms.

Positions held
 2007: Elected as corporator in Bhiwandi-Nizampur Municipal Corporation  
 2012: Re-elected as corporator in Bhiwandi-Nizampur Municipal Corporation 
 2015: Elected as Mayor of Bhiwandi-Nizampur Municipal Corporation

References

External links
 Shivsena Home Page
 bncmc.gov.in 

Living people
Marathi politicians
Shiv Sena politicians
People from Thane district
Maharashtra local politicians
Year of birth missing (living people)